A status referendum was held in the United States Virgin Islands on 11 October 1993. After the United States Congress modified the Revised Organic Act of the Virgin Islands to allow a vote on the status of the islands, a vote was scheduled for 1989. It was delayed several times until 1993, when voters were offered the options of integration into the United States, remaining a United States territory or independence.

Although 82% voted in favor of territorial status, voter turnout was below a mandated 50% threshold and as a consequence, the result was not legally binding.

Results

References

Referendums in the United States Virgin Islands
Status
United States Virgin Islands
United States Virgin Islands